Barron House may refer to:

Martin Van Buren Barron House, listed on the National Register of Historic Places in Eau Claire County, Wisconsin
Thomas Barron House, listed on the National Register of Historic Places in Ontario County, New York
Bray-Barron House, listed on the National Register of Historic Places in Barbour County, Alabama
Webb-Barron-Wells House, listed on the National Register of Historic Places in Wilson County, North Carolina

Buildings and structures disambiguation pages